Collaborations is rapper KJ-52's second studio album, and his first distributed by BEC Recordings. It features his most well-known song, "Dear Slim" which was shown on Total Request Live.

Track listing

References

KJ-52 albums
2002 albums